Unione Sportiva Grosseto 1912 is an Italian association football club, based in the city of Grosseto, Tuscany. The club was founded in 1912 as Unione Ginnico Sportiva Grossetana. The team's most associated nickname is grifone, after its logo, depicting a griffon. Its colours are red and white, and it currently plays in Serie C, the third level of Italian football.

The club's most recent success consists of 6 consecutive participations in Serie B between 2007 and 2013, notably reaching the play-off semifinals in 2008-09. It was most recently refounded in 2017.

History
 
The club was founded in 1912 as Football Club Grosseto, and made its debut in a match played and lost in Orbetello. The club joined the Italian Football Federation only nine years later, in 1921, being admitted in the Promozione division. In 1927, the club changes its official colours from black/white to the current white/red.
Since its foundation, Grosseto played extensively from Serie C to the amateur leagues. In 1995 the club was cancelled by the football federation because of financial troubles, thus losing the right to participate in the Serie C2 after having won Serie D the same year. Following these events, Grosseto joined Eccellenza, ending it in fifteenth place being therefore relegated to Promozione. However, two consecutive promotions from 1997 to 1999 brought Grosseto back to Serie D.

The Camilli Era (2000-2015)
In 2000, Piero Camilli purchased the club with the aim to bring Grosseto back into the pros. In the 2001–2002 season, Grosseto ended as Serie D (Round F) runners-up but were later admitted to Serie C2 to fill a league vacancy. The club successively won Serie C2 in 2004, being thus promoted to Serie C1. In 2005, Grosseto qualified for the promotion playoffs, losing the semifinal to Pavia; one year later, Grosseto gained again a spot in the playoffs, where they defeated Sassari Torres in the semi-finals, but lost to Frosinone in the finals, missing the opportunity to be promoted to Serie B for its first time in history. However, in the 2006–2007 season, under head coach Antonello Cuccureddu, who replaced Massimiliano Allegri after the ninth matchday, Grosseto finally managed to win Serie C1/A following a 1–0 away win at Padova in the final matchday with a goal by Carl Valeri, thus gaining a historical spot in the Serie B 2007-08. Cuccureddu left Grosseto by mutual consent with the club a few days following the triumphal win, and Giorgio Roselli was appointed to replace him for the 2007–08 Serie B club campaign.

The club started their historical first Serie B campaign with three disappointing consecutive defeats which led, on 11 September 2007, to the dismissal of Roselli and his replacement with former Parma boss Stefano Pioli, who led the team to a mid-table finish.

The 2008–09 season started with higher expectations under new head coach Elio Gustinetti; the team started its season showing a very impressive form, but then a result crisis led Grosseto out of the promotion playoff zone, causing the dismissal of Gustinetti and his replacement with Ezio Rossi. The subsequent return of Gustinetti led the team to finish in 6th place and Grosseto acceded to the play-off. The maremmani won the first match against Livorno (2–0), but they lost the second match being surpassed by the rivals (1–4), in a scandal game where Grosseto finished with 7 players and failed the promotion to Serie A.

The 2009–10 season was a relatively good season for the club, which finished in 7th place only a few points off the play-off zone. It was still a memorable season for Grosseto, thanks to their top striker Mauricio Pinilla who scored 24 goals in 24 matches and was transferred to US Palermo, in the Serie A, during the 2010 summer transfer market.

On 10 August 2012, Grosseto was provisionally, not yet enforceable, relegated, by the Disciplinary Commission set up for Scommessopoli scandal investigations, to Lega Pro Prima Divisione because of their involvement in the Scommessopoli scandal. Furthermore, the president of Grosseto has been suspended from all football activities for five years. But on 22 August 2012, Grosseto and its president are absolved by the Court of justice, eliminating the verdict of the first instance and so readmitted to Serie B.

The club suffered relegation at the end of the 2012-13 season, bringing 6 consecutive years in Serie B to an end. This was followed by two years of competing in the third division of Italian football. In the summer of 2015, owner Piero Camilli ended his 15-year tenure at the club.

FC Grosseto (2015-2017)
 
A new club, F.C. Grosseto S.S.D. successfully applied as a successor on 6 August 2015. However, the club folded after a relegation to Eccellenza Tuscany in 2017.

Ceri ownership: the return of US Grosseto 1912
On 18 July 2017, local entrepreneurs Mario and Simone Ceri, owners of Associazione Calcio Roselle (a local football club from the city suburb of Roselle) competing in Eccellenza Toscana, came on the scene. Following an agreement with former owner Piero Camilli and leveraging the league status, Ceri renamed the club to Associazione Sportiva Dilettantistica Unione Sportiva Grosseto 1912, thus inheriting the sporting tradition of the city.

The 2017–18 season ended with a third place in Eccellenza Tuscany, followed by a first place and promotion to Serie D the following season. The 2019–20 season marked the return of the club to the fourth level of Italian football and a second consecutive promotion to the Serie C for the 2020–2021 season.

Lamioni ownership: 2022...
In November 2022, famous local entrepreneur Giovanni Lamioni bought the franchise from previous owner Salvatore Guida. Lamioni gave the presidency role to Antonio Fiorini and called back Filippo Vetrini for the general sporting director place. The city welcomed the negotiation very positively and regained a vanished enthusiasm for the disappointing results of the previous season. Lamioni has announced that he will set up a team that will compete to return to Serie C in 2023–24.

Squad

Current squad

Achievements

Serie C1
Winners (1): 2006–07
Supercoppa di Lega Serie C1
Winners (1): 2007
Serie C2
Winners (1): 2003–04
Serie D
Winners (4): 1960–61, 1972–73, 1994–95, 2019-20
Runners-up (1): 2001–02
Eccellenza Tuscany
Runners-up (1): 1997–98
Winners (1): 2018-2019
Promozione Tuscany
Winners (1): 1996–97

References

External links
Official site of U.S. Grosseto F.C.

 
Football clubs in Tuscany
Association football clubs established in 1912
Serie C clubs
1912 establishments in Italy